Epidermal growth factor receptor substrate 15 is a protein that in humans is encoded by the EPS15 gene.

Function 

This gene encodes a protein that is part of the EGFR pathway. The protein is present at clathrin-coated pits and is involved in receptor-mediated endocytosis of EGF. Notably, this gene is rearranged with the HRX/ALL/MLL gene in acute myelogeneous leukemias. Alternate transcriptional splice variants of this gene have been observed but have not been thoroughly characterized.

Model organisms

Model organisms have been used in the study of EPS15 function. A conditional knockout mouse line, called Eps15tm1a(KOMP)Wtsi was generated as part of the International Knockout Mouse Consortium program—a high-throughput mutagenesis project to generate and distribute animal models of disease to interested scientists—at the Wellcome Trust Sanger Institute.

Male and female animals underwent a standardized phenotypic screen to determine the effects of deletion. Twenty six tests were carried out on mutant mice and one significant abnormality was observed: homozygous mutant animals had a decreased mean corpuscular hemoglobin concentration.

Interactions 

EPS15 has been shown to interact with:
 CRK 
 EPN1, 
 HGS, 
 HRB, and
 REPS2.

References

Further reading 

 
 
 
 
 
 
 
 
 
 
 
 
 
 
 
 
 
 
 

Genes mutated in mice
EH-domain-containing proteins